Köksal is a name of Turkish origin. It may refer to:

Given name
Köksal Toptan (born 1943), Turkish lawyer and politician with the Justice and Development Party
Köksal Yedek (born 1985), Turkish footballer

Surname
Ahmet Köksal (1920–1997), Turkish poet and writer
Burcu Köksal (born 1980), Turkish politician
Cansu Köksal (born 1994), Turkish female professional basketball player
Füsun Köksal (born 1973), Turkish composer
Hikmet Köksal (born 1932), Turkish retired general
Hüseyin Göksenin Köksal (born 1991), Turkish professional basketball player
İskender Köksal (born 1981), Turkish professional footballer
Mehmet Köksal (born 1963), Turkish lawyer
Nil Köksal, Turkish-born Canadian television and radio journalist
Pınar Köksal (born 1946), female Turkish composer
Serhat Köksal (born 1990), Dutch-born Turkish professional footballer
Sönmez Köksal (born 1940), Turkish civil servant

Turkish-language surnames
Turkish masculine given names